Cryptophis pallidiceps, also known as the western Carpentaria snake or northern small-eyed snake, is a species of venomous snake endemic to Australia. The specific epithet pallidiceps (“pale-headed”) refers to its body markings.

Description
The snake grows to an average of about 50 cm in length. The upper body is brown, grey or black, often with a paler head. The sides of the body are yellow-orangish, the belly white.

Behaviour
The species is viviparous, with an average litter size of four. It feeds on lizards and frogs.

Distribution and habitat
The species occurs in the Kimberley region of Western Australia and the Top End of the Northern Territory. It inhabits tropical woodlands. The type locality is Port Essington in the Northern Territory.

References

 
pallidiceps
Snakes of Australia
Reptiles of the Northern Territory
Reptiles of Western Australia
Taxa named by Albert Günther
Reptiles described in 1858